Maude Elizabeth Kee (née Simpkins; June 7, 1895 – February 15, 1975), known more generally as Elizabeth Kee, was a U.S. Democratic politician. She was the first woman elected to Congress from West Virginia. She attended Roanoke business college. Elizabeth dedicated herself to unemployment and veteran issues while in Congress. She was elected into congress on November 4, 1952.

Biography
Maude Elizabeth Kee was born Maude Elizabeth Simpkins in Radford, Virginia. She was one of John Jesse Wade Simpkins and Cora French Hall Simpkins 11 children. Both of Kee's parents held strong conservative views, which she began to challenge at a young age. For example, her parents were strict Baptists, so Kee converted to Catholism. After moving with her family to Roanoke, Virginia, she attended the National Business College in Roanoke. Around 1916, Lee worked as secretary for the Roanoke Times business office, and later worked as a court reporter for a local law firm.

After a failed first marriage to a railway clerk, James Alan Fraizer, she married John Kee. John Kee had been Fraizer's attorney in his divorce to Elizabeth. In 1925, she, Kee, and her two children from her previous marriage, moved to Bluefield, West Virginia. John Kee was elected to the 73rd Congress in 1932. Elizabeth served as her husband's executive secretary from November 1932, when he was first elected to Congress, until his death in 1951. After her husband's death, she was elected as a Democrat in a special election to succeed her husband in the United States House of Representatives serving the Fifth Congressional District of West Virginia in the 82nd through the 88th U.S. Congress. She was elected to six more terms and served from July 17, 1951, to January 3, 1965.

While serving in Congress, she served on the House Government Operations, Interior and Insular Affairs, and Veterans Affairs Committees, chairing the latter's Veterans' Hospitals Subcommittee. After struggling to win support for her economic redevelopment plans for her home district in West Virginia during the Eisenhower Administration, Congresswoman Kee threw her support behind President John F. Kennedy's campaign in 1960 and, through the Accelerated Public Works Act, funneled millions of dollars through an Area Redevelopment Administration to the state. She did not sign the 1956 Southern Manifesto, and voted in favor of the Civil Rights Acts of 1957 and 1960, as well as the 24th Amendment to the U.S. Constitution, but voted present on the Civil Rights Act of 1964. She did not run for re-election in 1964, and was succeeded in Congress by her son, James Kee. She died in Bluefield, West Virginia.

See also

United States congressional delegations from West Virginia
Women in the United States House of Representatives

References

External links
 
 Elizabeth Kee at The Political Graveyard

People from Bluefield, West Virginia
Female members of the United States House of Representatives
Women in West Virginia politics
1895 births
1975 deaths
People from Radford, Virginia
Democratic Party members of the United States House of Representatives from West Virginia
20th-century American politicians
20th-century American women politicians
20th-century American Episcopalians